Nadira Begum, better known by her pseudonym title, Munni Begum is a Pakistani vocalist and ghazal singer.

Early life
Munni Begum was born Nadira Begum in Murshidabad (now in West Bengal, India) in 1946. The third child of seven children. She first started taking music lessons from the famous singer Ustad Khwaja Ghulam Mustafa Warsi. It was this music teacher who gave her this professional name due to her small size and young age. Subsequently, she studied in the school of music for three years, and thereafter, she launched her career.

Her parents migrated from India to East Pakistan in the early 1950s. East Pakistan later became independent Bangladesh. She studied in BAF Shaheen School, Dhaka; however, she moved to Karachi, West Pakistan due to Bangladesh Liberation War of 1971.

Career
Munni Begum began her career as a singer in Karachi, Pakistan in the 1970s. She released her first album of ghazals in 1976. Then she sang many more hit ghazals and thus became a renowned ghazal singer of Pakistan. In her news media interviews, she always was quick-witted and bold. Even though Urdu language was not her mother tongue, she showed a remarkable talent for choosing ghazals with simple language. This was very effective and became one of the reasons of her popularity among common people. The other reasons for her popularity were that she had a voice characterized by its clarity and strength. In the 1980s, Munni Begum's rise coincided with the rapid growth of a then new technology, the cassette tape. Cassette tape prices were cheap compared to the old technology of vinyl records. On top of that, Munni Begum had a rich voice with many shades. She also was a good harmonium player.

Personal life
Munni Begum was married in the 1980s which resulted in a divorce in 1998. She has two daughters, Muniba Hasnain and Minara Umer, and one son Syed Muhammad Asad Ali. As of 2016, she lives in Chicago, United States and does not perform regularly.

Notable ghazals
As for Munni Begum's hit ghazals, the list is very long. Some of these are:
 Lazzat-e-Ghum Badhaa Dijeay
 Jhoom Barabar Jhoom Sharabi
 Har Qadam Zehmatein...
 Tumhare Sheher Ka Mausam Bada Suhana Lage (lyrics by poet: Ahmad Faraz)
 Ek Bar Muskura Do
 Awaargi Mein Had Se Guzar Jaana Chahiye
 Chahat MaeN Kya Dunya Dari, Ishq MaeN Kaisi Majboori
 Bewafa Se Bhi Pyar Hota Hai
 Bhoolne Wale Se Koi Kehde
 Dil Ko Hale Karar Mein Dekha
 Kisi kay Gham May Waqar Khona
 Idhar Zindagi Ka Janaza Uthey Ga (lyrics by poet: Tabish Dehlvi)
 Bhujhi Hoi Shama Ka Dhuaan Hun
 Mareez-e-Mohabbat Unhi Ka Fasana
 Laa Pilaade Saaqiya
 Yeh Hai Maikhana Yahan Rind Hain
 Jo fareb mein ne khaya tujhe razdan samajh kar
 Ay ishq hamen itna to bata anjam hamara kia ho ga
 Dil ki bat labon par la kar ab tak hum dukh sehtey hein
 Hum ne hasraton ke daagh aansuon se dho lie
 Merey saqia mujhe bhool ja
 kab mera nasheman ahl-e-chaman
 Ay merey hamnashin chal kahin aur chal
 Asman se utara gia
 Hamee charagh ki lao hein
 Kab mera nasheman ahl-e-chaman
 Piar ki mun mein jote jagae aik zamana beet gia
 Yeh sila mila he mujh ko teri dosti ke peechey
 Mein nazar se pee raha hoon yeh sama badal na jae
 Tum poocho aur mein na bataoon aisey tu halat nahin
 Josh darya mein tha kis qadar alaman
 Teri anjuman mein zalim ajab ehtamam dekha
 Sharab la sharab la
 Dekh kar dar-o-kahba ki ranginian
 Teri soorat nigahon mein phirti rahe
 Yahan tangi-e-qafas he
 Meri dastan-e-hasrat wo suna suna ke roey
 Botal khuli hey raqs mein aam-e-sharab hey

Discography 
 Munni Begum Khoobsurat Ghazlein Vol 1
 Awargi Vol-28
 Meri Pasand Vol. 1
 Meri Pasand Vol. 2
 Masti Mein Surahi Jhoomti Hai Vol. 1
 Masti Mein Surahi Jhoomti Hai Vol. 2
 An Evening With Munni Begum
 New Ghazals Vol. 26
 Munni Begum Vol-21
 Munni Begum Vol-20
 Sham-E-Ghazal
 Meri Pasand
 Munni Begum
 Munni Begum In Concert Vol. 4
 Munni Begum In Concert Vol. 3
 Munni Begum In Concert Vol. 2
 Munni Begum In Concert Vol. 1

Awards and recognition
 Pride of Performance Award (2008) by the Governor of Sindh on behalf of the President of Pakistan.

See also
 Jigar Moradabadi

References

External links

1946 births
Living people
Women ghazal singers
Pakistani people of Bengali descent
Pakistani ghazal singers
People from Murshidabad district
Recipients of the Pride of Performance
Singers from Karachi
Pakistani emigrants to the United States
American people of Bengali descent
People with acquired American citizenship
20th-century Pakistani women singers